The Tashan Power Plant is a fuel-fired power plant in Tashan, Shuitou Village, Jincheng Township, Kinmen County, Fujian Province, Republic of China.

History
The construction to build the power plant was approved by the Executive Yuan in January 1995. The construction was then completed in October 2000 with 4 generation units, unit 1–4. In March 1998, the construction for unit 5-8 was approved by the Executive Yuan and it was commissioned in February 2004. On 6 July 2016, the Ministry of Economic Affairs approved the construction of unit 9–10. The two generation units were ordered in 2017.

Infrastructure
To cope with the increasing electricity demand and generation, a petroleum transmission trestle was built in 2002 near the power plant for the transportation of diesel oil for the plant. This reduced the risk of fuel shortages.

See also

 List of power stations in Taiwan
 Electricity sector in Taiwan

References

2000 establishments in Taiwan
Buildings and structures in Kinmen County
Energy infrastructure completed in 2000
Jincheng Township
Oil-fired power stations in Taiwan